Jo Emily Handelsman (born March 19, 1959 in New York City) is the Director of the Wisconsin Institute for Discovery at University of Wisconsin–Madison. She is also a Vilas Research Professor and a Howard Hughes Medical Institute Professor. Dr. Handelsman was appointed by President Barack Obama as the Associate Director for Science at the White House Office of Science and Technology Policy, where she served for three years until January 2017. She has been editor-in-chief of the academic journal DNA and Cell Biology and author of books on scientific education, most notably Scientific Teaching.

Education
Handelsman earned her Bachelor of Science degree in agronomy from Cornell University in 1979 and her Ph.D. in molecular biology from the University of Wisconsin–Madison in 1984.

Career
Handelsman secured a faculty position in plant pathology at the University of Wisconsin–Madison in 1985. She remained at Wisconsin until 2009, and then took a position at the Yale University Department of Molecular, Cellular and Developmental Biology in 2010. Her research involves the study of microorganisms present in soil and insect gut. She is responsible for coining the term metagenomics and is particularly known for her work in pioneering the use of functional metagenomics to study antibiotic resistance. She has published books and held workshops on scientific teaching, for which she is recognized nationally.

She is an active researcher and advocate of women in science issues. One of Handelsman's seminal studies found that the gender of a name on a science resume affected a professor's inclination to hire, mentor, and pay applicants for a lab position. She was co-director of the Women in Science and Engineering Leadership Institute and was the first president of the Rosalind Franklin Society. In 2008 she received the Alice C. Evans Award. In 2011 she was awarded the Presidential Award for Science Mentoring, which recognizes mentors in science or engineering. In 2015 she gave the third annual Patrusky Lecture.

Honors and awards
She was elected to the American Academy of Arts and Sciences as a Fellow in 2019.

Bibliography
Scientific Teaching (2006)
Entering Mentoring:A Seminar to Train a New Generation of Scientists (2008)
A World Without Soil: The Past, Present, and Precarious Future of the Earth Beneath Our Feet (2021)

References

External links
Interview with Handelsman by CBE: Life Sciences Education
Jo Handelsman's Short Talk: "The Practice of Mentoring"

1959 births
American microbiologists
Cornell University College of Agriculture and Life Sciences alumni
Howard Hughes Medical Investigators
Living people
Office of Science and Technology Policy officials
University of Wisconsin–Madison College of Agricultural and Life Sciences alumni
University of Wisconsin–Madison faculty
Yale University faculty
Women microbiologists